Musab Ahmed Alsharif Eisa (born 10 December 1993) is a Sudanese professional footballer who plays as a striker for the Sudanese club El Hilal El Obeid, and the Sudan national team.

International career
Ahmed made his international debut with the Sudan national team in a 2–2 friendly tie with Zimbabwe on 2 January 2022. He was subsequently part of the Sudan squad that was called up for the 2021 Africa Cup of Nations.

References

External links
 
 

1993 births
Living people
Sudanese footballers
Sudan international footballers
Association football forwards
El Hilal SC El Obeid players
Sudan Premier League players
2021 Africa Cup of Nations players